The following is a list of awards and nominations received by American comedian Stephen Colbert.

Colbert is an American comedian writer, producer, political commentator, actor, and television host. He worked as a correspondent on The Daily Show with Jon Stewart (1997–2005) before receiving his own show, The Colbert Report (2005–2015), both on Comedy Central. He has since gone on to replace David Letterman and now hosting The Late Show with Stephen Colbert (2015–present) on CBS.

He has received two Daytime Emmy Award nominations and 44 Primetime Emmy Award nominations, winning 10 awards for his work on The Daily Show and The Colbert Report and one for a 2020 election special that aired on Showtime. He has also received three Grammy Award nominations, winning twice for Best Comedy Album for A Colbert Christmas: The Greatest Gift of All! in 2010 and for Best Spoken Word Album for America Again in 2014.

He has also received five Peabody Awards for his work on The Daily Show in 2000 and 2004, The Colbert Report in 2007, and 2011, and Late Show with Stephen Colbert for 2020. He has received twelve Producers Guild of America Award nominations, winning six times for The Daily Show, and twelve Writers Guild of America Awards, winning four awards for The Colbert Report.

Major associations

Emmy Awards

Grammy Awards

Peabody Awards

Guild awards

Producers Guild Awards

Writers Guild Awards

Critics awards 
TCA Awards

Other awards

References

External links
 

Awards
Lists of awards received by American actor
Lists of awards received by writer